Grabrovec may refer to:

 Grabrovec, Slovenia, a village near Metlika, Slovenia
 Grabrovec, Croatia, a village near Zabok, Croatia